Haplopharynx is a genus of small, free living marine flatworms found in the North Atlantic and the Mediterranean. It is the only genus in the monotypic family Haplopharyngidae.

Species
The following species are recognized in the genus Haplopharynx:
 Haplopharynx quadristimulus Ax, 1971
 Haplopharynx rostratus Meixner, 1938
 Haplopharynx papii Schockaert, 2014

Anatomy
Subterminal mouth leads to the simple pharynx, which subsequently continues as an intestine with terminal anal pore. A short retractable proboscis is present anteriorly to the pharynx. Variable number of glands producing rhabdites open at the surface of proboscis. Nervous system built similarly as in Macrostomida. Haplopharynx are hermaphroditic, with separate male and female gonopores. Male copulatory organ is equipped with hard, sclerotised stylet and set of needles.

Reproduction and development
Copulation lead to the internal fertilization. Egg is entolecithal and show spiral cleavage pattern.

References

External links
 Taxonomy Database 

Turbellaria
Rhabditophora
Platyhelminthes genera